Kot Nijabat is a village of Bhawana 4 km away from new lari adda of Bhawana on Jhang, Chiniot road towards Chiniot.

Location 
It is located on the bank of Chenab River on Jhang, Chiniot road.

References 

Villages in Chiniot District
Chiniot District